Almy Purves "Purv" Pullen (February 2, 1909 – October 18, 1992), later known by the stage name Dr. Horatio Q. Birdbath (or simply Dr. Birdbath), was an American voice actor. He was known for mimicking the sounds of animals and birds.

Early life
Pullen was born on February 2, 1909, in Philadelphia, Pennsylvania. Growing up on a farm, he began imitating bird-calls. He incorporated bird-calls into his first job as a disc jockey in Akron, Ohio, and at other radio stations.

Career
Pullen began performing as a voice actor in films in the 1930s. He was the voice of Cheetah in Tarzan films and produced the bird sounds in Disney's Snow White and the Seven Dwarfs (1937). Pullen's vocal contributions appear in many cartoons featuring Mickey Mouse, Betty Boop, and Popeye. Pullen was also the voice of the howling coyote in Cecil B. DeMille's 1935 film The Crusades, and the squawks and jungle sounds for Martin Denny's 1951 pop instrumental "Quiet Village".

In 1945, Pullen began a collaboration with Spike Jones, providing sound effects and other comic gimmicks on many of the classic Jones recordings. Jones gave Pullen the stage name "Dr. Horatio Q. Birdbath."

Pullen was the voice of Pierre the Parrot in Walt Disney's Enchanted Tiki Room at Disneyland and Disneyworld. He was also heard in the San Francisco Bay Area as the voice of Roscoe the Dog on the Dr. Don Rose show on KFRC.

Pullen also appeared in nightclubs as a ventriloquist with a dummy named Johnny. He appeared on a 1958 episode of What's My Line? as the mystery guest.

Personal life
Pullen was a longtime resident of Vacaville, California, where he performed puppet shows at the Nut Tree in the 1970s and 1980s and where he appeared with "Roscoe the Dog," a supposedly invisible dog puppeted by means of a stiffened dog leash.

Filmography

References

External links

1909 births
1992 deaths
American male voice actors
Animal impersonators
Male actors from Philadelphia
People from Vacaville, California